Mildmay is a community of people of primarily English and German descent in the municipality of South Bruce, Bruce County, Ontario, Canada.  it is northwest of Minto and south of Walkerton on Highway 9. Formosa lies to the northwest, and Neustadt to the east.  Mildmay was possibly named after "the place in England where the famour Mildmay Evangelical Meetings were held".  Post office dates from 1868.

Mildmay is a good example of a prosperous rural Ontario small town. It contains a well stocked grocery store, hardware store, pharmacy, 2 diners/restaurants, a pub as well as many other businesses. Mildmay also has a recreational complex with an arena, a baseball diamond and a few other sport facilities. The town has a park with a playground and many walking trails, a library, a fire station and a few churches of different Christian denominations. Mildmay Veterinary Clinic is a mixed animal practice serving Mildmay and the surrounding area. The population change in Mildmay from 2011 to 2016 was +3.5%.

Shortly before Christmas every year the town has an annual "Hanging of the Green" festival and lighted night parade to celebrate the beginning of the Christmas season, with free apple cider, a live nativity scene, sausages, a Santa, and Christmas carols. Mildmay holds an annual fall fair in September in the Rotary park, as well as many other community events and activities year round,

Mildmay-Carrick Public School and the Sacred Heart Catholic school teach students from kindergarten through grade eight. High school students in Mildmay attend school in Walkerton (a larger town 10 minutes away), which has 2 high schools (Catholic and public).

The town's official mascot is a muskrat named Mildred, after Mildred Westmay, the first person to open a business in Mildmay.

External links
 Mildmay on South Bruce Website

References

Communities in Bruce County
Former villages in Ontario
Populated places disestablished in 1998